Eurostar  or Eurostars may refer to:

Railways
 Eurostar, an international train service between London, Paris, Brussels, and Amsterdam
 British Rail Class 373, an electric multiple unit train specially built for providing the Eurostar services
 Eurostar International Limited (EIL), the successor to Eurostar (UK) Ltd which was a company responsible for the British share of the joint Eurostar operation alongside NMBS/SNCB in Belgium and SNCF in France
 Eurostar Group, EIL's parent company
 Eurostar Italia, former domestic train services in southern Europe

Aerospace
 Evektor SportStar and EuroStar, ultralight aircraft
 Eurostar (satellite bus), a series of spacecraft manufactured by EADS Astrium (and formerly Matra Marconi Space)
 EuroStar, Turkish Star TV's European channel for Turks lived in Europe

Entertainment
 Eurostar (roller coaster), a travelling roller coaster in Germany
 Eurostar, a team of supervillains from the Champions (role-playing game)

Road vehicles
 Eurostar Automobilwerk, a former assembly plant of Chrysler in Graz, Austria
 Iveco EuroStar, heavy duty dump trucks  
 Eurostar, the coach (autobus) brand of the Shaanxi Automobile Group
 Bohse Eurostar, a car model 
Kia EuroStar, the name used in Taiwan for the first generation of the Kia Picanto range of city cars

Sport 
FIBA EuroStars, annual basketball event
Eurostars (team), women's ultimate (frisbee) team

Other
 Eurostar, the logo used to show participation in the Eurostar